Nehru School of Architecture (NSA) is one of the  colleges of Nehru Group of Institutions, Coimbatore, Tamil Nadu. It was established in 2015 and is located in the Nehru Aeuronautical Campus, Palakkad, main road, Kuniyamuthur.

NSA is headed by  Dr. Amrutha Sachin as its Director. The college is approved by the Council of Architecture (COA), New Delhi, affiliated to Anna University and The Indian Institute of Architects. The school conducts undergraduate courses in Architecture. The school has its own library with a collection of publications which include books, journals, thesis reports and back volumes.

Architecture schools in India
Universities and colleges in Chennai